Eugene "Fats" Heard (October 10, 1923 – December 5, 1987) was an American jazz drummer.

Early life and education 
Born in Cleveland, Ohio, Heard graduated from Central High School and studied piano at the Cleveland Institute of Music before taking up the drums as his primary instrument.

Career 
Heard played with Coleman Hawkins and Lionel Hampton and was part of Erroll Garner's band from 1952 to 1955. He played on Garner's original 1954 recording of "Misty". In the late-1950s, Heard ran the Modern Jazz Room (formerly Cotton Club) in downtown Cleveland with his friend Jim Bard.

Discography
With Erroll Garner
Mambo Moves Garner (Mercury, 1954)

References 

1923 births
1987 deaths
American jazz drummers
20th-century American drummers
American male drummers
Musicians from Cleveland
Jazz musicians from Ohio
20th-century American male musicians
American male jazz musicians